Rolf Rämgård (born 30 March 1934) is a former Swedish cross-country skier. He competed in the 15, 30 and 50 km events at the 1960 Winter Olympics and won a silver medal over 30 km and a bronze over 50 km.

In the 1970's, Rämgård turned into politics and in 1974–85 was a member of the Swedish parliament and Municipal commissioner in his home municipality. He also became the minister of sports in the government and the mayor of the Älvdalen municipality.

Cross-country skiing results
All results are sourced from the International Ski Federation (FIS).

Olympic Games
 2 medals – (1 silver, 1 bronze)

World Championships

References

External links

1934 births
Living people
People from Älvdalen Municipality
Cross-country skiers at the 1960 Winter Olympics
Swedish male cross-country skiers
Olympic medalists in cross-country skiing
Medalists at the 1960 Winter Olympics
Olympic silver medalists for Sweden
Olympic bronze medalists for Sweden